Catopsis paniculata is a species in the genus Catopsis. This species is native to Central America and Mexico.

References

paniculata
Flora of Central America
Flora of Mexico
Plants described in 1883